The school system in Chennai consists of an array of structured systems. Children typically start school (junior or lower kindergarten) at the age of three, progressing to senior or upper kindergarten followed by twelve years of study. Class 10 and class 12 involve taking public examinations conducted by various accreditation boards. Most of the schools are accredited to Tamil Nadu State Board.

Administrative categories
Chennai schools fall into two administrative categories - government schools called as corporation schools, and privately run schools. Private schools fall under the following categories: schools with central board syllabus, schools with state board syllabus, schools with matriculation syllabus, schools with Anglo Indian syllabus and schools with Oriental syllabus. In private managed state board syllabus schools there are two categories: self-financing and government aided schools. In some government aided schools a few sections may also be self-financing. From the academic year of 2011, the Government of Tamil Nadu has brought in "Samachiyar Kalvi" syllabus to replace Anglo Indian, state, Oriental and matriculation modes of education. Now only the following syllabi are available in Tamil Nadu: Samachyar Kalvi, CBSE, ICSE and IGCSE.

Medium of instruction
Most private schools are English medium (medium of instruction is English) while the government run schools are primarily Tamil medium. The schools run by the central government have a dual medium of instruction - English and Hindi.

Accreditation
All recognized schools belong to one of the following accreditation systems:

 Central Board of Secondary Education - for all years of study
 International General Certificate of Secondary Education - for all years of study
 National Institute of Open Schooling (NIOS)-for all years of study 
 Tamil Nadu State Board - for all years of study
 Council for the Indian School Certificate Examinations - for all years of study
 Matriculation System for classes K-10 and automatically rolled over to Tamil Nadu State Board for classes 11 and 12
 Tamil Nadu Anglo-Indian System for classes K-10 and automatically rolled over to Tamil Nadu State Board for classes 11 and 12

Exceptions to the above rule include a few schools that follow the Montessori method, International Baccalaureate or the American system.

Schools

See also

Chennai Corporation Schools

References

 
Chennai-related lists
Lists of schools in Tamil Nadu